Melon Demon Divine is the second solo album by Kee Marcello, the former guitarist in the Swedish hard rock band Europe.

Track listing
 "Pre-Fix" – 0:29
 "E.M.D." – 4:37
 "Enemies" – 4:32
 "Blood" – 4:56
 "Epic" – 4:36
 "Raptor" – 4:38
 "If" – 5:37
 "Falling Apart" – 4:25
 "Hey Romeo" – 3:33
 "Evil Ways" – 3:52
 "Tattoo for Patto" – 3:37
 "Comin' Home" – 5:32
 "Ride On" – 5:38
 "Can I B the 1" – 3:33
 "Raptor" [instrumental] – 9:24

Personnel
Kee Marcello – Lead vocals, guitars, bass, keyboards
Snowy Shaw – Drums

Album credits 
Kee Marcello – producer

References 
https://web.archive.org/web/20080417090142/http://glory.metalkings.ru/bands/k/k2.htm

Kee Marcello albums
2004 albums
Frontiers Records albums